Adrián Campos Jr. (born 5 October 1988 in Valencia) is a Spanish racing driver. He has competed in such series as the European F3 Open Championship (formerly the Spanish Formula Three Championship). He signed to compete in the 2010 Indy Lights season in the United States. Campos finished 6th in points with a best finish of 4th three times, including back-to-back oval races to close out the season, and had the fastest lap of the race at Kentucky Speedway. He placed second among rookie competitors, only behind series champion Jean-Karl Vernay.

Racing record

American open-wheel racing results
(key) (Races in bold indicate pole position) (Races in italics indicate fastest lap)

Indy Lights

Complete Auto GP Results
(key)

References

External links
 Career statistics from Driver Database
 

1988 births
Living people
Spanish racing drivers
Euroformula Open Championship drivers
Indy Lights drivers

Team Moore Racing drivers
Campos Racing drivers